Royal High School (RHS) is a public high school in Simi Valley, California. Royal is part of the Simi Valley Unified School District and is located on Simi Valley's west side.

History 
Royal High School opened its doors in 1968 with sophomores and juniors, graduating its first class in 1970. At the time, the Simi Valley Unified School District educated ninth-grade students at its junior high schools.

Academics 
Royal High School has been named a California Distinguished School and is the recipient of a Digital High School Technology Grant. The grant provides numerous courses of study and allows the school to offer a variety of Advanced Placement classes including AP English, Statistics, Physics, Calculus AB and BC, Computer Science, Studio Art, World and U.S. History, Spanish, French, Government, Economics, Chemistry, and Biology, as well as many honors courses. RHS also offers career education via the Regional Occupational Program in the performing, visual, and technical arts. Students may take classes in piano, photography, video production, broadcasting, music (choir and band), dance, stagecraft, web design, drama, graphics design, or drawing/painting.

Royal High School has a partnership with the nearby Ronald Reagan Presidential Library and Museum. Students may earn a diploma seal by completing a community service project, taking an AP Social Science class, and being involved in school governance. Students often are involved in events at the Reagan Library, some of which involve meeting with government officials at the federal, state, and local levels. RHS has one of the few International Baccalaureate programs in Ventura County and is the only school in the area with an Air Force JROTC program.

Athletics 

Royal High School's athletic teams are nicknamed the Highlanders, and the school's colors are hunter green and gold. The school is a charter member of the Coastal Canyon League (CCL), a conference within the CIF Southern Section (CIF-SS) that was established in 2014. Royal competes in the CCL for all sports except football and in the Marmonte Football Association for football. Prior to 2014, the school was a long-time member of the Marmonte League. Royal's primary rival is Simi Valley High School on the east side of the city.

Royal High School offers a variety of sports. The school is known for its boys' cross country, boys' soccer, boys' volleyball, girls' water polo, and wrestling teams which have won many section championships.

Baseball 
The Highlanders baseball team won its first CIF-SS championship in 2021.

Boys' cross country 
The Royal boys' cross country team is known for winning the CIF-SS championship 5 years in a row.

Boys' soccer 
As of 2008, the Royal High School boys' soccer team has won 3 CIF-SS championships and 17 league titles.

Boys' volleyball 
The RHS boys' volleyball team has won 5 CIF-SS championships: 1989, 1990, 1992, 1994, and 2022; they have finished as runners-up 5 times.

Girls' water polo 
The RHS girls' water polo team won CIF-SS championships in 2017 and 2018.

Wrestling 
The Royal wrestling team was established by Jerry Barnes, father of Oklahoma State two-time national champion and tournament outstanding wrestler Chris Barnes. They were CIF-SS Division 5 dual-meet champions twice in a row in 2005 and 2006, and they were CIF-SS Division 2 finalists in 2010 and semi-finalists in 2007, 2008, and 2009. From 2005 to 2008, Royal's dual-meet record was 58-5.

Notable alumni 

Mike Mo Capaldi (2007), professional skateboarder
Eric King (1982), professional baseball player
Jon Koppenhaver (2000), professional mixed martial artist
Ken Lutz, American football player
Matt Magill (2008), pitcher for the Los Angeles Dodgers
Matt Mahurin (1977), illustrator, photographer and film director
Curtis Marsh, Jr. (2006), American football player
Scott Rice (1999), pitcher for the New York Mets
Maiara Walsh, actress

References

External links 

Education in Simi Valley, California
High schools in Ventura County, California
Simi Valley Unified School District schools
Educational institutions established in 1968
Public high schools in California
International Baccalaureate schools in California
Buildings and structures in Simi Valley, California
1968 establishments in California